Phostria samealis is a moth in the family Crambidae. It was described by George Hampson in 1912. It is found in the Amazon region of Brazil.

References

Phostria
Moths described in 1912
Moths of South America